Lumding Junction railway station serves the Indian city of Lumding in Assam. It is the divisional headquarter of Lumding railway division of NFR. It is located in Hojai district. It is the 2nd biggest railway station of Lumding railway division, after . It is one of the oldest railway station in India built under Assam Bengal Railway. It consists of 5 platforms with a total of 68 halting trains & 3 originating trains. The station consists of double diesel line.

History
In the pre-partition days, Assam was linked to Chittagong through the Akhaura–Kulaura–Chhatak line and Akhaura–Laksam–Chittagong line. The Chittagong link had been constructed in response to the demand of the Assam tea planters for a railway link to Chittagong port. Assam Bengal Railway started construction of a railway track on the eastern side of Bengal in 1891. A  track between Chittagong and Comilla was opened to traffic in 1895. The Comilla–Akhaura–Kulaura–Badarpur section was opened in 1896–1898 and extended to Lumding in 1903.

Assam Bengal Railway opened the Lumding–Guwahati line in 1900.

After independence and partition, the entire Guwahati–Lumding–Dibrugarh–Tinsukia  sector was converted from metre gauge to broad gauge by 1997.

The Lumding–Silchar gauge conversion work was scheduled to be completed in March–April 2015.

Amenities

Following services available in Lumding Jn. Railway Station:

  02 (02 Bedded) AC Retiring Rooms with Free Wi-Fi/TV/Locker/Charging point  
  07 (02 Bedded) Non AC Retiring Rooms with Free Wi-Fi/TV/Locker  
  01 (08 Bedded) Non AC Dormitory with Free Wi-Fi/TV  
  Executive Lounge
  High Speed  Google Railwire Free Wi-Fi service  
  Upper Class/Lower Class Waiting Rooms having Free Wi-Fi/AC/TV/Charging points/Drinking water & separate Ladies/Gents Washrooms  
  Food Plaza  
  Tea Stall  
  FOB with 2X  Escalator/Elevators    3X
  CCTV Surveillance

Loco shed
There was a metre gauge loco shed at Lumding. When the entire Guwahati–Lumding–Dibrugarh line was converted to broad gauge, the Lumding–Badarpur–Silchar line has also been converted to broad gauge. The YDM-4 metre gauge locos from New Guwahati loco shed were transferred to Lumding. Recently, the metre-gauge shed is transformed to EMU shed

Lumding railway division
Lumding railway division was created on 1 May 1969.

Major trains 
 New Delhi–Dibrugarh Rajdhani Express (Via New Tinsukia)
 New Delhi–Dibrugarh Rajdhani Express (Via Moranhat)
Guwahati−Dibrugarh Shatabdi Express
Silchar–New Delhi Poorvottar Sampark Kranti Express
Dibrugarh–Kanyakumari Vivek Express
Silchar - Thiruvananthapuram Aronai Superfast Express
Silchar - Coimbatore Superfast Express
Agartala - Sealdah Kanchanjunga Express
Agartala - Firozpur Tripura Sundari Express
Dibrugarh–Amritsar Express
Dibrugarh–Chandigarh Express
New Tinsukia–Bengaluru Weekly Express
Dibrugarh-Lalgarh Avadh Assam Express
Dibrugarh - Lokmanya Tilak Terminus Superfast Express
Dibrugarh-Howrah Kamrup Express via Guwahati
Silchar - Sealdah Kanchanjunga Express
Agartala - Deoghar Weekly Express
New Tinsukia–Rajendra Nagar Weekly Express
Guwahati–Jorhat Town Jan Shatabdi Express
Guwahati - Dibrugarh Town Nagaland Express
Guwahati–Silchar Express
Guwahati - Mariani BG Express
New Tinsukia - Darbhanga Jivachh Link Express
Alipurduar–Lumding Intercity Express
Silchar - New Tinsukia Barak Brahmaputra Express
Guwahati–Ledo Intercity Express
Rangiya–New Tinsukia Express

References

External links
 

Railway junction stations in Assam
Railway stations in Hojai district
Lumding railway division
Transport in Lumding